The Oktoberfest is a two-week festival held each year in Munich, Germany during late September and early October. It is attended by six million people each year and has inspired numerous similar events using the name Oktoberfest in Germany and around the world, many of which were founded by German immigrants or their descendants.

Around the world
Outside of Germany, the largest Oktoberfest is in Kitchener, Ontario (formerly Berlin) and surrounding cities in Waterloo Region, attracting over 700,000 visitors annually. The next largest Oktoberfest outside of Germany is mostly regarded as being in Blumenau, Brazil with (700,000+ visitors), Cincinnati, Ohio, United States (500,000+ visitors) and the Denver Oktoberfest Denver, Colorado, United States (450,000+ visitors). In New York City, there is even an Oktoberfest held under a big tent along the city's East River. However, the largest one mostly depends on specific year's numbers and varies with sources. Currently Oktoberfest is spreading to new geographical locations; starting in September 2007, Montreal began hosting its own Oktoberfest. One can find Oktoberfest celebrations mixing German traditions, food and beer with local culture outside of Germany.

Argentina
The National Beer Festival (Fiesta Nacional de la Cerveza) is Argentina's version of the German Oktoberfest. It has taken place every October since 1963 in Villa General Belgrano, Córdoba. The party emerged by the hand of the first German immigrants. This festival attracts thousands of tourists for two consecutive weekends.

Australia
In Australia, the universities are notorious in their celebrations of Oktoberfest every year, and as students graduated and moved on, this rolled over into pubs and restaurants in the university areas. After the 2012 Oktoberfest Party the University of New South Wales council banned the celebration of the festival on university campus grounds.

Following the end of many of the university based events a private event company, Nokturnl Events, launched 'Oktoberfest in the Gardens' in the Supreme Court Gardens, Perth on 7 October 2011. The event has since expanded to Adelaide, Melbourne and Sydney. The event now attracts over 50,000 patrons annually making it the largest Oktoberfest celebration in Australia.

Royal Melbourne Oktoberfest is held within the world heritage listed Royal Exhibition Building in Melbourne. Oktoberfest In The Gardens is held in Melbourne Showgrounds. Sydney also have their instalment of this event located within Australian Technology Park.

The Harmonie German Club, Canberra, holds an Oktoberfest over a three-day period every year in October.  The festival has been held for over 50 years, and attracts a large number of visitors from Canberra and surrounding regions. In 2017 the event moved over the border to Queanbeyan in New South Wales and was held on 27 – 29 October.

Brisbane celebrates its annual Brisbane Oktoberfest, which is considered Australia's largest German festival. It is held over the first two weekends in October and offers a variety of German beers, wines and food, beer hall music and dance and singing performances.

Since 1984, an annual Oktoberfest celebration has been held in the seaside village of Emu Park on Queensland's Capricorn Coast.  The event is held in the town's Bell Park and is organised by the local Lions Club.

Brazil

In Brazil there are several Oktoberfests around the country, most of them in towns settled by Germans and Austrians in the Southern portion of the country (like the Oktoberfest of Blumenau, the Oktoberfest of Itapiranga, the Oktoberfest of Igrejinha, the Oktoberfest of Santa Cruz do Sul, the Oktoberfest of Rolândia, the Oktoberfest of São Jorge d'Oeste, the Oktoberfest of Ponta Grossa, the Oktoberfest of Marechal Cândido Rondon, among others). There are also Oktoberfests in other portions of the country (like the Oktoberfest in der Altstadt von Olinda, the Oktoberfest Cearense in Guaramiranga, the Oktoberfest do Club Transatlântico and the Oktoberfest do Brooklin in São Paulo, among others). The Oktoberfest of Blumenau is one of the largest German festivals around the world, attracting around one million people every year.

Canada

In Canada there is an annual nine-day celebration spread over 18 days in Kitchener, Ontario. It attracts over 700,000 visitors annually. While its most popular draws are the beer-based celebrations, other cultural and entertainment attractions also fill the week. The most well-known is the parade held on Thanksgiving Day. As the only major parade on Canadian Thanksgiving, it is televised nationally. Coincidentally, the closing day of the Bavarian Oktoberfest also falls on the German equivalent of Thanksgiving, Erntedankfest.

The twin cities and surrounding area have a long history of German roots. Kitchener was formerly named Berlin. A significant portion of the population of Kitchener and surrounding areas identify themselves as being of German descent, and many still speak German. A common phrase at the celebrations is Gemütlichkeit, German for congeniality, or warm friendliness.

Oktoberfest celebrations are also held annually in Sherbrooke, Quebec at the beginning of October. The one night event is held by Université de Sherbrooke's Engineering Students' Association. It draws approximately 6,000 revellers each year.

Two smaller events take place in the Greater Toronto Area:

 Toronto Oktoberfest at Ontario Place
 Unionville Oktoberfest Heritage Days in Unionville, Ontario

Chile
In Chile bierfests are celebrated in Valdivia, Puerto Octay, Puerto Varas, Frutillar and Llanquihue and Malloco.

China
 Qingdao has the largest Oktoberfest celebration in all of China with celebrations since 1991.  Around 4 million have participated.
 Beijing, held at the Paulaner Brauhaus in the Kempinski Hotel since 1993.
 Shanghai, at the Paulaner Brauhaus and held since 1997.
 Hong Kong, Marco Polo German Bierfest has been held since 1992. The celebration takes place in mid October to early November at Marco Polo Hong Kong Hotel in Harbour City, Tsim Sha Tsui. Other events also take place in other spots in Hong Kong:
 Oktoberfest at Happy Valley Racecourse
 Erdinger Oktoberfest at Indian Recreation Club
 Macau MGM Macau hosted their first Oktoberfest in 2011

Colombia
In Colombia it is sponsored by Bavaria Brewery. A series of concerts and events are held along different cities, with special emphasis in those with German background like Bucaramanga.

India

Oktoberfest celebrations have become very popular with Indian hotels, restaurants and malls. Numerous such events happen in Indian metros in October. The most significant one is held since 2009 by the Indo-German Chamber of Commerce in Pune, traditionally a large hub of German companies in India.

Palestine
An Oktoberfest celebration is held in the town of Taybeh, in the (Taybeh Brewery). The first Taybeh Oktoberfest was held in 2005.

Philippines
Oktoberfest beer and music festival celebrations held usually from September up to December. It is organized by San Miguel Brewery, which is the makers of San Miguel Beer and other alcoholic beverages. The 2015 edition of their Oktoberfest, was coincided with the 125th anniversary of San Miguel Beer Pale Pilsen.

Russia
 Moscow Oktoberfest is held Red Square.

South Africa
Oktoberfest is celebrated annually in mid September at various German schools around the country most notably the Deutsche Schule Pretoria.

Sri Lanka

Oktoberfest celebration is held in Colombo, Sri Lanka every year.

United States

German-Americans are the largest self-reported ancestral group in the United States. Correspondingly, there are hundreds of large and small Oktoberfest celebrations held annually throughout the country, the largest being Oktoberfest Zinzinnati in Cincinnati, Ohio.

Known for its large German immigrant population, the Commonwealth of Pennsylvania and its historic Pennsylvania Dutch (Pennsylvania Deutsch) population are well known to have many Oktoberfest celebrations during the months of September and October. These celebrations became increasingly popular among the general Commonwealth population in the later half of the 20th century with the rise of microbreweries, and with the opening of authentic German brew houses such as Hofbrauhaus in Pittsburgh, PA.

Other major celebrations across the United States include those at:

 Old World Oktoberfest in Huntington Beach, CA
 Cullman, Alabama; 
 Nashville, Tennessee's oldest-running festival is the Nashville Oktoberfest, in the downtown Germantown neighborhood. In 2015, more than 140,000 people attended. In 2016, official attendance was estimated as over 215,000 people, making the Nashville Oktoberfest the second largest in the USA.
 Tempe Town Lake in Tempe, Arizona 
 Margaret T. Hance Park in Phoenix, Arizona
 The Phoenix Club in Anaheim, California 
 Big Bear City, California 
 Campbell, California 
 Chico, California Located at Sierra Nevada Brewing Co..
 Oakland, California 
 Sacramento, California
 San Francisco, California 
 Alpine Village in Torrance, California 
 San Diego, California 
 Montrose, California 
 Denver, Colorado 
 The Colorado Council of Arts, Science and Culture hosts Parker Oktoberfest in Parker, Colorado
 the Delaware Sängerbund in Newark, Delaware 
 Wickham Park (Melbourne, Florida)
 Cape Coral, Florida (largest in Florida)
 Miami, Florida 
 Helen, Georgia, a Bavarian-themed town
 Hofbrauhaus Chicago in Rosemont, Illinois, a German celebration, starting in 2013, expecting many beer lovers
 Indianapolis, Indiana 
 Jasper, Indiana 
 Seymour, Indiana 
 Amana, Iowa
 Hays, Kansas 
 Danville, Kentucky
 Mandeville, Louisiana 
 Frankenmuth, Michigan (The first Oktoberfest outside Munich that the Parliament and the City of Munich sanctioned);
 Grand Rapids, Michigan
 New Ulm, Minnesota (In 2002 the Census Bureau released a report showing 65.85% of population with German ancestry, the greatest proportion among US cities).
 Jefferson City, Missouri
 Hermann, Missouri 
 St. Louis, Missouri
 Hattiesburg, Mississippi
 Norfolk, Nebraska
 Sidney, Nebraska
 Germania Park in Rockaway Township, New Jersey 
Red River, New Mexico
 Irondequoit, New York 
 Hickory, North Carolina 
 the Ohio State Fair grounds and the Germania Singing and Sport Society in Columbus, Ohio 
 Berea, Ohio 
 Minster, Ohio 
 Wilmington, Ohio 
 Tulsa, Oklahoma 
 Mt. Angel, Oregon; Mt. Angel has held an Oktoberfest (in September) since 1966. 
 Sertoma Field in Walhalla, South Carolina 
 Saxonburg, Pennsylvania , Sprankle's Octoberfest (Weekend after Labor Day) since 2019.  
 East Allegheny (Pittsburgh), Pennsylvania 
 Reading, Pennsylvania
 Newport, Rhode Island 
 Kingsport, Tennessee 
 Addison, Texas 
 Boerne, Texas 
 Fredericksburg, Texas 
 Galveston, Texas 
 Muenster, Texas (their version is called "Germanfest" and is held in April) 
 New Braunfels, Texas (called Wurstfest). Began in 1961. Attendance typically ranges from 125,000 to 200,000 people.
 Slaton, Texas ("Slaton Saint Joseph Sausage Festival," held on the third Sunday of October) 
 Shiner, Texas
 at least 11 other Texas towns 
 Snowbird, Utah, a resort in the mountains above Salt Lake City 
 neighborhood of Lago Mar, Virginia Beach, Virginia; 
 Lovettsville, Virginia; 
 Martinsville, Virginia
 neighborhood of Fremont, Seattle, Washington
 Leavenworth, Washington, a Bavarian-themed town
 Appleton, Wisconsin 
 La Crosse, Wisconsin, called Oktoberfest, USA 
 New Glarus, Wisconsin 
 Milwaukee, Wisconsin 
 many others

Vietnam
Oktoberfest celebrations are co-organized annually by the German Business Association in Hanoi and Ho Chi Minh City. In 2012, Oktoberfest Vietnam in Ho Chi Minh City celebrated its 20th year with a seven-day event.

Venezuela

In Venezuela, specifically in Colonia Tovar, it is held annually since 1970 . Sometimes music groups have been invited from Germany to interpret typical music. The Historic center of Colonia Tovar has a population of about 10,000 inhabitants and it is estimated that during the days of the event the town receives twice that in visitors. 
In Greater Caracas, it's celebrated in the suburb of El Hatillo, it's sponsored by the embassy of Germany and Poland, and the German-speaking Catholic Community.

Zambia

Oktoberfest is celebrated annually in Zambia around 10 October at Fringilla, Chisamba, Central Province and many other various locations in Lusaka.

Europe

Germany

Bavaria
Note that traditional fairs in Bavaria, called Dult, Volksfest (popular festival) etc., are similar to the Oktoberfest in nature (not in size), but not called Oktoberfest as they did not arise in imitation of it. Of these, the Gäubodenvolksfest of Straubing enjoys particular fame.

Munich - The Original

Hannover

The Oktoberfest Hannover is a fair which takes place every year at the end of September/beginning of October. It usually lasts 17 days and features 140 rides and inns, two large beer tents seating more than a thousand people each, and numerous stands, beer gardens and five small beer tents offering food and refreshments. The program consists of a Dirndl-Competition, three Fireworks, two Family-Days, a hand lantern parade for kids and a backstage tour. You can get a special festival-beer from the local brewery "Brauerei Herrenhausen", the "Lüttje Lage" (an alcoholic speciality of Hannover) and many food from Lower Saxony and Bavaria. With around one million visitors each year, it is the second-largest Oktoberfest in Germany.

Berlin
Oktoberfest in Berlin continues to grow. Several large areas, including Alexanderplatz and Zentraler Festplatz, are turned into Bavarian-like beer and food tents. Live brass Bavarian bands play at venues around town and people can be seen in traditional Bavarian dress around the city. Many places also serve the official Oktoberfest beers that are made in Munich. These events last from mid-September to early-mid October, and are the largest Oktoberfest events outside of Munich.

Poland

See also
 Beer festival
 Cannstatter Volksfest - Volksfest held in the Swabian city of Stuttgart at a similar time of year to Oktoberfest
 German diaspora

Notes
 Oktoberfest in Shanghai, China

External links

 Festival of Beer: Search for Beer Festivals around the World
 2017 Oktoberfest: Women's oktoberfest outfits 2017 - & The Casualties - slideshows by Life magazine
 2016-2017 Oktoberfest celebrations
 Sacramento Turn Verein: Turn Verein
 8 Best Big-City Oktoberfests in the U.S.  Biggest Oktoberfests Infographic. Retrieved October 21, 2014.

Culture in Munich
September observances
October observances
 Oktoberfest
German-American culture
German-Australian culture
German-Canadian culture
German-New Zealand culture